Baningime is a surname. Notable people with the surname include:

 Beni Baningime (born 1998), English footballer of Congolese origin
 Divin Baningime (born 2000), Congolese footballer

Surnames of African origin